KeepCup is an Australian company that manufactures reusable coffee cups. The company was founded in 2007 by Abigail Forsyth and her brother Jamie Forsyth after they grew concerned about the volume of single-use coffee cups that they were using in their own chain of Melbourne cafes, Bluebag.  They set out to develop a product solution that worked both behind the espresso machine and for customers; not compromising speed of service or coffee quality, while ensuring a better experience for coffee on the go. For this reason, KeepCup is often described as the world's first barista-standard reusable coffee cup. Their products are sold in Australia, New Zealand, United States, Canada, Europe and China. According to the company, the production is partially done locally in each region, except silicone bands that are imported from China.

In 2009, KeepCup's aim was to lift reuse rates to 30%. In 2017, this goal was achieved by many of their customers after the ABC TV production War on Waste highlighted the issue of the one billion non-recyclable coffee cups that are sent to Australian landfills every year. With the release of David Attenborough's Blue Planet II and the UK Parliament's Environmental Audit Select Committee recommendation in 2018 to ban disposable cups if they are not recyclable by 2023, public consciousness of the global waste crisis has significantly increased, inspiring KeepCup to campaign harder to remove disposable cups from the public landscape.

Corporate responsibility 

As of 2019, KeepCup estimates that its users have diverted billions of non-recyclable, single-use cups from landfill.
 
KeepCup donates 1% of its global sales revenue to the One Percent for the Planet campaign, citing its “responsibility [as a] corporate citizen to the environment, our employees and our communities.”  KeepCup also have long-standing relationships with conservation organisations like Sea Shepherd.

In 2018, KeepCup conducted a life-cycle assessment (LCA) of their products, which showed that KeepCups have a lower environment impact than single-use paper/polypropylene cups after 24 days of use (assuming one use per day). After 10 days, one use per day, all KeepCups have a lower impact than compostable cups. 

KeepCup have advocated for legislative action that would ban single-use packaging since 2009, and hope to see the world free of single-use packaging by 2023.

References 

Australian companies established in 2007
Food and drink companies established in 2007
Coffee companies of Australia
B Lab-certified corporations in Australia